Coleophora elodella is a moth of the family Coleophoridae. It is found in the islands of Hokkaido and Honshu in Japan.

Adults are on wing from June to September.

The larvae possibly feed on Juncus.

References

elodella
Moths described in 1988
Moths of Japan